The name Haima has been used to name three tropical cyclones in the Western Pacific Ocean. The name was submitted by China and is the Chinese name of seahorse.

 Tropical Storm Haima (2004) (T0420, 24W, Ofel) – made landfall south of Shanghai
 Tropical Storm Haima (2011) (T1104, 06W, Egay) – made landfall, first in Zhanjiang, Guangdong, China, and later in landfall over Hanoi, Vietnam.
 Typhoon Haima (2016) (T1622, 25W, Lawin) – powerful category 5 super typhoon that made landfall in Peñablanca, Cagayan of the Philippines and in Haifeng County, Shanwei in the Guangdong province of China.

The name Haima was retired after the 2016 typhoon season, and was replaced with Mulan, which means Magnolia, a kind of flower native to China.

Pacific typhoon set index articles